is a train station in Izumo, Shimane Prefecture, Japan. It is on the Kita-Matsue Line, operated by the Ichibata Electric Railway.

This station is served by local and express services. The station is named after the Izumo Science Center, located nearby.

Lines
 Ichibata Electric Railway
 Kita-Matsue Line

Adjacent stations

|-
!colspan=5|Ichibata Electric Railway

References

Bataden Kita-Matsue Line
Railway stations in Shimane Prefecture
Railway stations in Japan opened in 1928